Sound Museum is the second studio album by Japanese music producer Towa Tei, released on May 25, 1997 by East West Records. Collaborators on the album include Kylie Minogue, Biz Markie, and Bebel Gilberto.

Sound Museum peaked at number 17 on the Oricon Albums Chart. By July 1997, it had sold over 100,000 copies.

Track listing

Notes
  signifies an additional producer

Sample credits
 "Corridor" contains samples of "Hello Baby" and "Another Sound Museum" by Sweet Robots Against the Machine.

Charts

Release history

References

External links
 

1997 albums
Towa Tei albums
Albums recorded at Chung King Studios
Albums recorded at MSR Studios
East West Records albums
Elektra Records albums
Museums in popular culture